Pyrausta anastasia is a moth in the family Crambidae. It was described by Ayuna A. Shodotova in 2010. It is found in southern Siberia.

The wingspan is 17–18 mm. The forewings are brown, with a round yellow spot near the costal margin. The hindwings are slightly darker than the forewings with a pale yellow band.

References

Moths described in 2010
anastasia
Moths of Asia